Inside Man is a drama-thriller television serial developed by Steven Moffat. The four-episode series premiered on 26 September 2022, and was broadcast on BBC One.  It was released on Netflix in the US on 31  October 2022.

Cast

Production
Filming locations included St Andrew's Church in Farnham, Godalming Railway Station, Godalming, outside the Beehive Pub in Bedfont Middlesex, Broad Street in Wokingham and Welcome Break Fleet Services in Fleet.

Episodes

Reception

Critical reception

Inside Man was rated 65% certified fresh on Rotten Tomatoes. Top critic Graeme Blundell from The Australian writes, "It's superbly acted by a bunch of experienced actors who know just what kind of heightened style is required here, directed in immersive style by the accomplished McGuigan, and thoroughly enjoyable. Just hold that wine glass." Charles Hartford from A Geek Community writes, "Inside Man Season 1 delivers a gripping tale that is well worth its short, four-hour runtime...The series pulls the viewer into its depths as it explores how far people will go when they are caught in the wrong place at the wrong time." The Guardian described it as being a "funny and typically meaty mystery from Steven Moffat". Pat Stacey, writing in the Irish Independent said, "Probably the most foolish scene of all came in  Tuesday’s finale when Mary threatens journalist Beth (Lydia West) ... with a breadknife while making 'whoosh' sounds. This nudged Inside Man into full-blown sitcom territory. Strange, that, since Moffat seemed to want to say something serious about human nature and people's capacity for violence." Anita Singh of The Daily Telegraph said, "Moffat can throw any amount of good lines or clever little plot twists into this show, but it is built on a flaw so fundamental that it's impossible to get past it."

The series features Steven Moffat's own son, Louis Oliver, whose performance was described by Radio Times as "show stealing".

Viewing figures
The first episode was watched 5,028,000 times on iPlayer alone during 2022, making it the 7th most viewed individual programme on the platform that year.

References

External links
 
 

2022 British television series debuts
2022 British television series endings
2020s British drama television series
2020s British television miniseries
BBC Television shows
English-language Netflix original programming
Murder in television
Television series by Hartswood Films
Television series set in 2022
Television series by BBC Studios